During the Kipper and Wipper period and until the late 18th century, state coins (Landmünzen} in the German part of the Holy Roman Empire were those that were not minted according to the relevant imperial standard (Reichsfuß), but using a lesser alloy and thus were only fit for circulation in the territory of their mint masters. There were therefore a type of fiat coin known as a Scheidemünze.

State coins were mostly issued in smaller denominations, but from 1687 even Brandenburg 2/3 thalers bore the designation “Brandenb. Landmünz."

The term "state coin" should not be confused with the term "national coins" or "state coinage", which includes all the coins issued by a country.

See also 
 Kipper mints (Electoral Saxony)
 Kippertaler

References

Bibliography 
 Kroha, Tyll (1997). Großes Lexikon der Numismatik. 2nd edn. Gütersloh: Bertelsmann Lexikon Verlag.
 Schrötter, Friedrich Frh (1970).Wörterbuch der Münzkunde. 2nd, unchanged print of the 1930 edn.  Berlin: Walter de Gruyter.

External links 

Coins of the Holy Roman Empire
Silver coins